|}

References
 Akpedonu, Erik and Czarina Saloma (2011) Casa Boholana: Vintage Houses of Bohol. Ateneo de Manila University Press

Buildings and structures in Tagbilaran
Tagbilaran